Dinka Kulić (born 2 August 1997) is a Croatian volleyball player. She is a member of the Croatia women's national volleyball team.

Career 
She was part of the Croatian national team at the 2015 FIVB World Grand Prix at the 2015 European Games in Baku. and at the 2021 Women's European Volleyball League, winning a silver medal.

At club level she played for Zok Vibrobeton in 2015, and HAOK Mladost Zagreb from 2016 to 2021.

References

External links 
 https://www.cev.eu/Competition-Area/PlayerDetails.aspx?TeamID=9965&PlayerID=48250&ID=964

1997 births
Living people
Croatian women's volleyball players
Place of birth missing (living people)
Wing spikers
Volleyball players at the 2015 European Games
European Games competitors for Croatia
Mediterranean Games gold medalists for Croatia
Mediterranean Games medalists in volleyball
Competitors at the 2018 Mediterranean Games
21st-century Croatian women